Kansas Christian College may refer to:

 Kansas Christian College (Lincoln), a school that closed in 1913
 Kansas Christian College (Overland Park), a school formerly known as Kansas City College and Bible School